Line 4 of the Beijing Subway is a subway line in Beijing's mass transit network. It entered into operation on 28 September 2009, and runs from north to south, parallel and to the west of Line 5, through Haidian, Xicheng, and Fengtai Districts in the western half of the city. It runs from Anheqiao North in the north and ends at Gongyixiqiao in the south, but the 4-Daxing connected line runs all the way to Tiangongyuan in Daxing. All stations are underground except Anheqiao North. Riding on this line starts from a fare of RMB(¥) 3.00 depending on the distance traveled. Line 4's color is teal.

Line 4 and Daxing line operate as a single line although they are classified as separate lines. Two different services are run during the day: A full service covering both Line 4 and Daxing line and a shorter service that ends at Xin'gong station, the first station of Daxing line. Combined, the Line 4/Daxing Corridor carries an average of 1.24 million passengers every day in 2017, growing to about 1.4 million passengers per day by 2019.

Hours of operation
The first south-bound trains departs from Anheqiao North at 5:00 AM. The first northbound train departs from Gongyixiqiao at 5:10 AM. The last northbound train leaves Anheqiao North at 10:45 PM. The last southbound train leaves Gongyixiqiao at 11:10 PM. Each train completes the entire journey in 48 minutes.

Route
In the north, Line 4 begins in Anheqiao, just beyond the Summer Palace, and heads south past the Old Summer Palace, through the university district and Zhongguancun, Beijing's high-tech silicon village, before turning east at the National Library of China and passing the Beijing Zoo en route to Xizhimen. After entering the 2nd Ring Road at Xizhimen, Line 4 resumes southwards at Xinjiekou and traverses the old city through Xisi, Xidan, Xuanwumen, Caishikou, and Taoranting Park. It passes the city's high-speed rail link at the Beijing South railway station before reaching the terminus at Gongyixiqiao. Construction began in 2004 but delays have pushed back the opening date by two years to 28 September 2009.

Service routes
  —  (through service via Daxing line)
  —  (through service via Daxing line)
 Rush hour (7:00-8:00):  —  (through service via Daxing line)

List of Stations

Planning and construction
Plans for Line 4 date back to the 1950s when Beijing's first subway line was still under construction. It was planned to run from the Summer Palace, east towards Xizhimen, southeast to Zhongshan Park, terminating at the Beijing Stadium, which near today's Tiantandongmen Station. Ultimately, the section between Summer Palace to Xizhimen was built as planned. However, construction only formally started in 2004.

On 3 December 2004 Hong Kong's MTR Corporation, Beijing Infrastructure Investment Co., Ltd., and Beijing Capital Group Co., Ltd. signed the Beijing Metro Line 4, investment, construction, operation principle of cooperation agreement, making Line 4 the Mainland China's first rail transit line financed using a public-private partnership framework. Subsequently, on 8 November 2005, a joint venture among the 3 companies was established. The Hong Kong MTRC will invest 735 million RMB to the construction of Line 4 and in return have the right to operate Line 4 for 30 years.

On 11 February 2009, the construction of Line 4 is nearing completion with all tunnels bored. On 6 March, four subway trains begin testing while Hong Kong's then Chief Executive, Donald Tsang, visited the project. On 28 September 2009, Line 4 was officially opened for trial operation. Bringing the number of subway lines in Beijing to 9. On 30 December 2010, the Daxing line started trial operation, with direct service into Line 4.

The planned stations have been identified as Baiwangshan, Xibeiwang, Aerospace City West, and Yongfeng. However, by June 2010, Line 4's northern extension was cancelled and replaced by the northern extension of Line 16 which opened in 2016.

Operation
Unlike the other lines of the Beijing Subway, which are completely state-owned and operated, Line 4 was built and is managed by the Beijing MTR Corp. Ltd., a three-way joint-venture among the Hong Kong MTR Corporation, the Beijing Capital Group ("BCG"), and the Beijing Infrastructure Investment Co. ("BIIC"). The Hong Kong MTR, which operates the Hong Kong Mass Transit Railway, and the state-owned BCG each holds a 49% stake in the venture and the BIIC has 2%. The JV is responsible for 30% of the investment capital to build Line 4, mainly to finance the purchase of electrical and mechanical equipment, while the Beijing Municipal Government provided the remaining 70%, to cover civil engineering, station, and track work costs.

The Beijing government has also awarded the JV a concession to manage Line 4 for 30 years. The PPP JV model was designed to introduce private capital as well as advanced metro management methods to the growing Beijing Subway. Among the most visible differences in management of Line 4 is a ban on food and beverage consumption inside Line 4 trains and stations.

Rolling Stock

Gallery

References

External links

 Beijing MTR Corp. Ltd official site

Beijing Subway lines
MTR Corporation
Railway lines opened in 2009
2009 establishments in China
750 V DC railway electrification